Indotyphlops lazelli, commonly known as the Hong Kong blind snake or Lazell's blind snake, is a species of snake in the family Typhlopidae. This species is characterized by having 18 scale rows. It is endemic to Hong Kong.

References 

Indotyphlops
Snakes of China
Reptiles of Hong Kong
Endemic fauna of Hong Kong
Taxa named by Olivier Sylvain Gérard Pauwels
Reptiles described in 2004
Critically endangered fauna of China